Kolea may refer to:

Koléa, Algeria
Koléa District, Tipaza Province, Algeria
The Hawaiian name (kōlea) for the Pacific golden plover
The Hawaiian species of the plant genus Myrsine (also kōlea)

People
Sotir Kolea (1872–1945), Albanian folklorist